"Breathe" is a song by English band the Prodigy, released in November 1996 as the second single from their third album, The Fat of the Land (1997). It became the group's second consecutive number-one in the United Kingdom and also topped the charts in the Czech Republic, Denmark, Finland, Hungary, Ireland, Norway, and Sweden. The song features a drum break from the song "Johnny the Fox Meets Jimmy the Weed" of the group Thin Lizzy. The whiplashing sword sound effect is a sample of the song "Da Mystery of Chessboxin", by Wu-Tang Clan. As with "Firestarter", Jim Davies played the guitar in the song. In 2003, Q Magazine ranked "Breathe" number 321 in their list of the "1001 Best Songs Ever".

History
The first ever performance of the song was held at a concert at the Pionir Hall in Belgrade, Republic of Serbia, on 8 December 1995, 11 months prior to its release. It was the first major international music act to play in Belgrade since the breakup of Yugoslavia, and came shortly after UN sanctions were partially lifted. "Breathe" thus became an iconic song for Serbia's urban youth.

Critical reception
Larry Flick from Billboard stated that the song, "with its jittery, faux funk beat, caustic synths, and snarling vocals" gets stronger with repeated spins. Nick Varley from The Guardian wrote, "Firestarter was only softening us up. Liam Howlett and his assorted helpers have now served up an even stunning slab of modern genius." He added, "You don't have to be in a club, helped by the strobe lights to appreciate the appeal as the drum roll cracks into place before giving way to the type of pounding beat that seems to have been the essential ingredient in the great singles of the year. Think Firestarter, Setting Sun, Born Slippy and Beck's Devil's Haircut." A reviewer from Music Week rated "Breathe" three out of five, noting that Howlett's "raucous electronic punksters get louder and less accessible by the day. This frantic, apocalyptic number will do well to emulate their spring number one Firestarter." 

James Hyman from the magazine's RM Dance Update praised the track, giving it five out of five. He added, "The punk-aggressive energy found here echoes landmark anarchist tracks such as the Pistols' 'God Save The Queen' (with its 'no future' cries) and Silver Bullet's 'Ruff Karnage'. Twangy guitar and ever-changing industrial breaks complement all the exhortations." Paul Moody from NME wrote, "'Breathe' - that rarest of things, a Prodigy track that grows on you - sounds ever more sinister in such claustrophobic surroundings, drilled as it is to a brain-numbing intensity of kick drums over which Keith howls the still baffling lyric, "Twisted animator!"." A reviewer from People Magazine said that songs like this "are cathartic performances capable of spreading dance fever to the stubbornest rock-and-roll head-bangers".

Chart performance
The song was a major worldwide hit, reaching the top 10 in several countries such as Australia, Austria, Belgium, the Netherlands, New Zealand and Switzerland. "Breathe" was a number-one hit in Denmark, Finland, Ireland, Norway, Sweden and the United Kingdom. The song was also a hit in France, reaching number 26. In the United States, the song reached number 18 on the US Hot Modern Rock Tracks chart. The single also returned to the Billboard charts after Flint's death, entering number 14 on its Dance/Electronic Digital Songs Sales chart in its 16 March 2019 issue.

Music video
The accompanying music video for "Breathe" was directed by English director Walter Stern and took place in what resembled an abandoned, decrepit apartment building, with the band members experiencing various aural, visual and psychological phenomena, with Keith Flint and Maxim representing the phenomena, while Leeroy Thornhill and Liam Howlett are caught in the phenomenon. Various animals, like an alligator, and crickets, make an appearance, evoking different types of phobias. The music video won the 1997 MTV Video Music Award for Viewer's Choice and International Viewer's Choice Award for MTV Europe. The video was also the band's final video to feature dancer Leeroy Thornhill.

Track listings
 UK, Canadian, and Australian CD singleAustralian cassette single "Breathe" (edit) – 3:59
 "Their Law" (live at Phoenix Festival '96 featuring PWEI) – 5:24
 "Poison" (live at the Tourhout & Werchter Festival '96) – 5:16
 "The Trick" – 4:25

 UK 12-inch singleA1. "Breathe" (edit) – 3:59
A2. "The Trick" – 4:25
B1. "Breathe" (instrumental) – 5:35
B2. "Their Law" (live at Phoenix Festival '96 featuring PWEI) – 5:24

 UK cassette single and European CD single' "Breathe" (edit) – 3:59
 "The Trick" – 4:25

Charts

Weekly charts

Year-end charts

Certifications

Release history

In popular culture
The song is included in a 2012 television commercial for Tooheys Extra Dry. Up until the 2012 PDC World Darts Championship, Dutch darts player Michael van Gerwen used the song as his walk-on theme. This song is also used as its theme song of the Filipino defunct public service program, Aksyon Ngayon.

Remixes
Alongside other The Fat of the Land songs, Breathe was remixed by The Glitch Mob and Zeds Dead on a sampler titled The Added Fat EP'' in 2012.

In 2021, two remixes by Rene LaVice featuring RZA were released for the F9 Soundtrack.

Camo & Krooked and Mefjus released a remix of the song in 2022 which was awarded the "Best Remix" award at the Drum & Bass Arena Awards 2022.

References

External links
 
 Music video screenshots gallery

1996 singles
1996 songs
European Hot 100 Singles number-one singles
Irish Singles Chart number-one singles
Maverick Records singles
Music videos directed by Walter Stern
Mute Records singles
Number-one singles in the Czech Republic
Number-one singles in Denmark
Number-one singles in Finland
Number-one singles in Hungary
Number-one singles in Norway
Number-one singles in Scotland
Number-one singles in Sweden
The Prodigy songs
Songs written by Liam Howlett
Songs written by Maxim Reality
UK Singles Chart number-one singles
XL Recordings singles